Coleophora gobincola is a moth of the family Coleophoridae.

References

gobincola
Moths described in 1982